Kharija ibn Hudhafa (died 22 January 661) was a companion of Muhammad and a commander in the Muslim conquest of Egypt during the reign of Caliph Umar. He served as the chief judge and commander of the security forces in Egypt under the governor Amr ibn al-As.

Life
Kharija ibn Hudhafa hailed from the Quraysh tribe of Mecca. The specific clan to which he belonged is a matter of contradiction in the traditional Muslim sources; the Banu Sahm, Banu Adi and Banu Amir ibn Lu'ayy are all mentioned as Kharija's clan. Kharija was a companion of the Islamic prophet Muhammad. He gained distinction for his bravery and horsemanship during Muhammad's lifetime. In 640, Caliph Umar dispatched him as one of four commanders an Arab army led by al-Zubayr ibn al-Awwam to reinforce the campaign of Amr ibn al-As to conquer Byzantine Egypt. After the Muslim victory at the Battle of Heliopolis (Ain Shams), Amr had Kharija's brother Abd Allah take possession of Heliopolis and establish terms with the inhabitants of the surrounding villages. After the fall of Babylon in April 641, Amr dispatched Kharija to conquer the Fayyum oasis, Hermopolis (el-Ashmunein), Akhmim, Bashrudat and the villages of Upper Egypt and make similar terms with their inhabitants.

While Amr was away besieging Alexandria, he left Kharija as his deputy over the Arab capital in Egypt, Fustat. He made Kharija the qāḍī (chief judge) of Egypt, where he became popular, and the head of his shurṭa (select troops or security forces). He remained in this office for at least two years into Caliph Uthman's reign (644–656) or throughout Uthman's reign. As opposition to Uthman culminated with a siege of his house in Medina, Kharija was at the forefront of those in Egypt calling to support the caliph. On 22 January 661, Amr, who had been restored to the governorship of Egypt and restored Kharija as the head of his shurṭa, made Kharija stand in for him to lead the Friday prayers as he was ill. A Kharijite assassin intending to kill Amr during the prayers killed Kharija instead, mistaking him for Amr. The assassin was subsequently apprehended and executed by Amr. In a letter sent to the latter in the aftermath of the assassination, Caliph Mu'awiya I called Kharija a sheikh (chief or elder) of the Quraysh and consoled Amr as Kharija's "paternal uncle and his companion, above his male relatives". One of Kharija's wives was a Kindite woman and his last recorded descendant was his grandson al-Zubayr ibn Suhayl.

References

Bibliography
 
 
 
 
 
 
 

661 deaths
Generals of the Rashidun Caliphate
Companions of the Prophet
Muslim conquest of Egypt
Quraysh